Bizenghast is a completed original English-language (OEL) manga written and illustrated by M. Alice LeGrow, and published in North America by Tokyopop. As of April 2012, eight volumes have been released, the first seven of which were published by Tokyopop. The first was released on August 9, 2005; the final was published July 31, 2012. Set in the haunted New England town of Bizenghast, the story follows an orphaned teenage girl who is tasked with returning each night to an ancient mausoleum to free the ghosts within the building. The series is also licensed in New Zealand and Australia by Madman Entertainment, in Hungary by Mangattack, in Germany by Tokyopop Germany, in Finland by Pauna Media Group, and in Russia by Comix-art.



Volume list

References

External links

Bizenghast at Tokyopop's website

Bizenghast
Bizenghast